Urmein (Romansh: Urmagn) is a municipality in the Viamala Region in the Swiss canton of Graubünden.

History
Urmein is first mentioned in 1156 as Hof de Ormen.

Geography
Of this area, 46.9% is used for agricultural purposes, while 39.5% is forested. Of the rest of the land, 5.7% is settled (buildings or roads) and the remainder (7.8%) is non-productive (rivers, glaciers or mountains).

Before 2017, the municipality was located in the Thusis sub-district, of the Hinterrhein district, after 2017 it was part of the Viamala Region.

Demographics
, 3.7% of the population was made up of foreign nationals. Over the last 10 years the population has grown at a rate of 19.8%.

, the gender distribution of the population was 45.9% male and 54.1% female.  The age distribution, in Urmein is; 1 child or 1.2% of the population is between 0 and 9 years old.  2 children or 2.5% are 10 to 14, and 3 children or 3.7% are 15 to 19.  Of the adult population, 14 people or 17.3% of the population are between 20 and 29 years old.  6 people or 7.4% are 30 to 39, 9 people or 11.1% are 40 to 49, and 18 people or 22.2% are 50 to 59.  The senior population distribution is 14 people or 17.3% of the population are between 60 and 69 years old, 10 people or 12.3% are 70 to 79, there are 4 people or 4.9% who are 80 to 89.

In the 2007 federal election the most popular party was the SVP which received 66.9% of the vote.  The next three most popular parties were the FDP (13.2%), the SPS (12.9%) and the local, small right-wing parties (4.2%).

In Urmein about 72.9% of the population (between age 25-64) have completed either non-mandatory upper secondary education or additional higher education (either university or a Fachhochschule).

Urmein has an unemployment rate of 0%.  , there were 28 people employed in the primary economic sector and about 11 businesses involved in this sector.  No one is employed in the secondary sector.  7 people are employed in the tertiary sector, with 4 businesses in this sector.

The historical population is given in the following table:

Languages
Most of the population speaks German (98.8%), with the rest speaking Polish ( 1.2%).

See also
Oberurmein

References

Municipalities of Graubünden